Anne Elizabeth Gabrielle Edmonds (born 11 October 1979) is an Australian comedian and actor best known for her stand-up work and for creating and starring in the ABC comedy series The Edge of the Bush. Beginning her career in comedy at 29 (2010) after working in mental health in rural Australia, Edmonds uses her suburban background, singing/songwriting and storytelling to create a fearless, self-deprecating and often macabre stand up voice. Humiliation and despair are central themes to Edmonds' comedy, as are stories of teenage mischief, sex, failure, relationships and loneliness.

Early life 
Raised Catholic in the Melbourne suburbs of Essendon and Strathmore, Edmonds studied at The University of Melbourne, completing a Bachelor of Arts Degree and Honours in Social Work.

Career
Edmonds has performed extensively at Australian festivals including the Melbourne International Comedy Festival, Adelaide Fringe, Brisbane Comedy Festival and Sydney Comedy Festival, and toured internationally multiple times, performing at the Edinburgh Festival Fringe and the Soho Theatre, London. Edmonds's solo stand-up shows have received multiple nominations for the Barry Award, an annual prize presented for the most outstanding comedy show at the Melbourne International Comedy Festival.

The comedian is known for her character work, most notably Helen Bidou, an emotionally unstable, sarong-wearing, fashion expert who was featured on the ABC hit comedy show Get Krack!n. A full-length live performance, "Helen Bidou: Enter the Spinnaker Lounge", exposed a dark familial relationship with her son Connor (Sam Campbell), and received a Barry Nomination and Sydney Comedy Festival Best Show Award.

Other characters created by the comedian include John Watts, Dusty Banjosen and Rebecca, all of which feature on her original ABC show The Edge of the Bush. Billed as "Australia's first Scandi-noir comedy", it was called "bizarre but satisfying" by Daily Review. The show tells of a callisthenics dynasty which has been torn apart by incest, as a family is forced back into reunion by confronting the truth of what really occurred at the edge of the bush.

As well as appearing solo, Edmonds is also a part of a satirical trio called True Australian Patriots with fellow comedians Greg Larsen and Damien Power. A mock-Australian patriots group on Facebook and YouTube, the characters Les, Steve and Gary are portrayed as inarticulate whilst spewing nonsense hate speech. Edmonds commented on the reception to the trio: "The real groups are ripe for parody... We get a lot of people who think it's real which is disturbing. Ours is a complete parody but we get people who go 'You guys suck. Stop it', from both sides... Those groups are appalling and we're hoping to show the mis-information that they are spreading. I find that far-right voice in Australia really distressing".

Edmonds stars and has contributed to Fancy Boy, an Australian six-part sketch comedy television series. Edmonds starred and co-wrote Fancy Boy alongside John Campbell, Stuart Daulman, Henry Stone, Jonathan Schuster and Greg Larsen. She is one of the voices in the Australian version of cult US Adult Swim show Fish Centre.
 
Edmonds has made guest appearances on All Star Family Feud, Celebrity Name Game, Dirty Laundry Live, The Project, Show Me the Movie!, Have You Been Paying Attention? and Hughesy, We Have a Problem. Her solo standup show What's Wrong With You? debuted on Amazon Prime Video in 2020.

Edmonds supported Marc Maron on his 2015 Australian tour.

Music 
Edmonds is a singer-songwriter and incorporates this into her comedy work. Most notable is her song "Flying Home", which was featured in ABC's The Edge of the Bush and is available on iTunes.

Awards

2015 
Winner: Melbourne International Comedy Festival (MICF), You Know What I'm Like “Comics' Choice Award”

2016 
Winner: Melbourne International Comedy Festival (MICF), True Australian Patriots “Director's Choice”
Nominee: Melbourne International Comedy Festival (MICF), That's Eddotainment! “Best Show”

2017 
Winner: AWGIE Awards, Fancy Boy episode Three Wishes “Comedy – Sketch or Light Entertainment” (co-written with Declan Fay, John Campbell, Stuart Daulman, Greg Larsen, Jonathan Schuster and Henry Stone.)
Nominee: Melbourne International Comedy Festival (MICF), No Offence, None Taken “Best Show”

2018 
Winner: Sydney Comedy Festival, Helen Bidou: Enter the Spinnaker Lounge “Best Show”
Nominee: Melbourne International Comedy Festival (MICF), Helen Bidou: Enter The Spinnaker Lounge “Best Show”
Nominee: Helpmann Awards, “Best Comedy Performer”

2019 
Nominee: Melbourne International Comedy Festival (MICF), What's Wrong With You? “Best Show”
Nominee: Helpmann Awards, “Best Comedy Performer”

ARIA Music Awards
The ARIA Music Awards are a set of annual ceremonies presented by Australian Recording Industry Association (ARIA), which recognise excellence, innovation, and achievement across all genres of the music of Australia. They commenced in 1987.

! 
|-
| 2020 || What's Wrong With You? ||  ARIA Award for Best Comedy Release ||  || 
|-

References

External links
 



1979 births
Living people
Australian women comedians
Comedians from Melbourne
Australian television actresses
Australian stand-up comedians
ARIA Award winners
People from the City of Moonee Valley